Elections to Bolton Metropolitan Borough Council were held on 4 May 2006.  One third of the council was up for election and the council stayed under no overall control, with the Labour Party overtaking the Liberal Democrats as the largest party and resuming control of the council after a two-year break.

20 seats were contested, with the Labour Party winning 10 seats, the Conservatives 7 and the Liberal Democrats 3
Overall turnout was 34.3%.

After the election, the composition of the council was
Labour 22
Conservative 21
Liberal Democrat 17

Election result

Council Composition
Prior to the election the composition of the council was:

After the election the composition of the council was:

Ward results

Astley Bridge ward

Bradshaw ward

Breightmet ward

Bromley Cross ward

Crompton ward

Farnworth ward

Great Lever ward

Halliwell ward

Harper Green ward

Heaton and Lostock ward

Horwich and Blackrod ward

Horwich North East ward

Hulton ward

Kearsley ward

Little Lever and Darcy Lever ward

Rumworth ward

Smithills ward

Tonge with the Haulgh ward

Westhoughton North and Chew Moor ward

Westhoughton South ward

References

 

2006
2006 English local elections
2000s in Greater Manchester